The Dorimcheon is a river in Seoul, South Korea.  It has its source in the valley between Gwanaksan and Samseongsan in southern Seoul and flows north, past Seoul National University.  From Sillim Station to Daerim Station, it is covered by Line 2 of the Seoul Subway, which is elevated above the stream for this distance, so it is still possible to walk alongside the waterway.  The river empties into the Anyangcheon 250m beyond the western the end of Dorimcheon Station's platforms.

Gallery

See also
Rivers of Korea
Geography of South Korea

References

Rivers of Seoul